Atakpamé is the fifth largest city in Togo by population (84,979 inhabitants in 2006), located in the Plateaux Region of Togo.   It is an industrial centre and lies on the main north-south highway, 161 km north of the capital Lomé.  It is also a regional commercial centre for produce and cloth.

History 
Atakpame is located on a hilly wooded savannah on the eastern end of the Atakora Mountain range, and together with Kpalimé represent the last major settlements of Yoruba origin dotted between the Niger and the Volta rivers. In the 1764 Battle of Atakpamé, the town played host to a clash between the rebellious Akyem vassal state with the help of Yoruba mercenaries of the Oyo Empire and the Dahomeans against the forces of the Ashanti Empire under their Asantehene, Kusi Obodum.  In 1763, the Ashante vassal state of Akyem made contact with the Dahomeans to the east while planning a rebellion with other dissident vassal states within the empire, such as the Kwahu and Brong. In the meanwhile, the Bantamahene, one of the Asante senior military officers had been relentlessly pressuring Asantehene Kusi Obodum to crush the building rebellion in war. The Bantamahene Adu Gyamera even went as far as threatening Asantehene's impeachment from power. However The Asantehene ordered no invasions until news reached them that the Akyems had sought out aid from the Oyo Empire. The result of the battle was a crushing defeat of the Ashanti forces and the death of their Juabenhene (head of one of the royal clans). The repercussion of this defeat by the Oyo Empire was the destoolment of Kusi Obodum, who was replaced by a much younger and charismatic Asantehene, Osei Kwadwo Okoawia.

In 1902, the town was the scene of a scandal in which German Catholic missionaries accused German colonial officials of mistreating girls. The scandal had reverberations in German politics. In 1914, during World War I, the British and French invaded the German colony of Togoland during the Togoland Campaign. It was aimed at capturing or destroying a powerful German radio station at Kamina near Atakpamé.  The Allies feared that German maritime raiders would be able to maintain contact with Berlin via the station and thus rapidly pass on intelligence.  A short campaign began on 6 August 1914, and the Germans were forced to destroy the station on 24 August before surrendering to the Allies on 26 August.

It was during this campaign that Alhaji Grunshi fired the first shot by anyone in British service during the war. Most native residents of the city are the Ana subgroup of the Yoruba people.

During Colonization the German colonial government built a wireless transmitter center in Kamina at Atakpame from 1911 to 1914 in the Togolese colony. This transcontinental radio station served as a link for the German colonies among themselves and to establish a connection between these colonies and the German metropolis.

Climate
Atakpamé has a tropical savanna climate (Köppen Aw) characterised by a short dry season with the northeasterly harmattan trade winds from November to February and a lengthy though not intense wet season between March and October.

Transport 
The town is served by a station of the main northern line of Togo Railways.

Governance 
The town was the administrative centre of German Togoland.

Places of worship 
Among the places of worship, they are predominantly Christian churches and temples : Roman Catholic Diocese of Atakpamé (Catholic Church), Evangelical Presbyterian Church of Togo (World Communion of Reformed Churches), Togo Baptist Convention (Baptist World Alliance), Living Faith Church Worldwide, Redeemed Christian Church of God, Assemblies of God. There are also Muslim mosques.

Sports
Atakpamé is the home of Korikossa d'Atakpamé football club.

International relations

Twin towns — Sister cities
Atakpamé is twinned with:
  Niort, France

Sources

References 

Populated places in Plateaux Region, Togo
Cities in Yorubaland